The Shadow DN7 was a Formula One car used by the Shadow team in two races late in the 1975 Formula One season.  Driven by Jean-Pierre Jarier, it never finished a race.

Development
The Shadow DN7 was designed by Tony Southgate and, in contrast to previous Shadow cars, the powerplant around which the car was designed was a V12.  This was the Matra MS71 V12, selected with an eye towards the high speed circuits on the Formula One calendar.  The chassis was similar to the DN5, and to allow for the increased consumption of the V12, the fuel tank capacity was increased.

Racing history
The DN7 only participated in two races, in Austria and Italy, driven by Jean-Pierre Jarier who qualified it 14th and 13th on the grid respectively.  Mechanical failures meant that it was never classified as a finisher.  As Matra decided to supply Ligier with its engines for 1976, Shadow did not continue with the car and Jarier reverted to the DN5 for the final race of the season in the United States.

Complete Formula One World Championship results
(key) (Results in bold indicate pole position; results in italics indicate fastest lap.) 

* all points scored in 1975 were with the DN5

Notes

References

External links
Shadow DN7 website

Shadow Formula One cars